The Foreign Interference (Countermeasures) Act 2021, or Fica, is a statute of the Parliament of Singapore. Enacted in 2021, it seeks to "protect the public interest by counteracting acts of foreign interference". The Bill was introduced on 13 September 2021 and passed on 4 October 2021.

Background
Legislation targeting foreign influence in Singapore had been mooted in as early as 2017. In March 2021, Second Minister for Home Affairs Josephine Teo announced that the government was considering the use of "legislative levers" to combat foreign influence.

Key provisions
The act grants the Minister for Home Affairs the authority to investigate individuals suspected of being foreign agents engaged in "hostile information campaigns". An independent panel, chaired by a judge, will consider appeals against the minister's findings, although persons marked as "politically significant" may not be allowed to file such appeals. Authorities will also be allowed to compel social media platforms and website operators to hand over user data, without any justification in select instances.

Reactions and statements

Support
Facebook issued a statement agreeing with the goals of the bill, while also noting that it was worded "very broadly".

Opposition
Reporters Without Borders described the act as "legal monstrosity with totalitarian leanings", while asserting that "(i)t is clearly independent media outlets that the FICA is targeting on national sovereignty grounds." Activist Thum Ping Tjin claimed that the bill was a "coup" attempt by Minister for Home Affairs K. Shanmugam. Member of Parliament Gerald Giam opined that the bill had a "significant impact on free speech and government accountability". In a joint statement published on 1 October, Singaporean academics Cherian George, Chong Ja Ian, Linda Lim, and Teo You Yenn expressed their concern that Fica would curtail academic freedom in the country. A day after the legislation was passed, Amnesty International described Fica as "a tool for crushing dissent". Following K. Shanmugam's parliamentary speech on Fica, several activists, including Kirsten Han, Lim Tean, Jolovan Wham, and Terry Xu, were served with correction orders under the Protection from Online Falsehoods and Manipulation Act for insinuating that he had said that "rule of law does not operate in Singapore".

Legislative history
The Foreign Interference (Countermeasures) Bill was introduced to Parliament on 13 September 2021 by Minister for Home Affairs K. Shanmugam. On 29 September, the Workers' Party announced amendments it had tabled two days earlier for the next parliamentary sitting. They included judicial oversight, a more precise scope of executive powers under the law to prevent abuse, and greater and transparency as to who was subject to the law. Although party members understood the need to prevent foreign interference, they disagreed with the bill as initially written. On 30 September, Non-constituency Member of Parliament Leong Mun Wai filed an unsuccessful petition to delay the passage of the bill. A second reading of the bill took place on 4 October, during which Shanmugam gave a two-hour-long speech defending Fica, while stating that the government would accept some of the 44 amendments proposed by the Workers' Party. The bill was passed in Parliament the same day, at around 11:15 pm; 75 Members of Parliament (all 70 from the People's Action Party and 5 Nominated Members of Parliament) voted in favour of the legislation, whereas 11 from the Workers' Party and the Progress Singapore Party objected with 2 abstentions (all NMPs).

References

External links

Freedom of speech in Singapore
Singaporean legislation
2021 in Singapore
2021 in law